"Signed, Sealed, Delivered (I'm Yours)" is a soul song, by American musician Stevie Wonder, released in June 1970 as a single on Motown's Tamla label. It spent six weeks at number one on the U.S. R&B chart and peaked at number three on the U.S. Pop chart. In the same year, the song was also released on the album Signed, Sealed & Delivered.

The song was arranged by Paul Riser and features an electric sitar  played by Eddie "Chank" Willis. In the lyrics, the singer has left his girlfriend but realizes it was a mistake.  "I've done a lot of foolish things that I really didn't mean."  Now he has returned, making the commitment that he's back, similar to a special delivery package from the post office, "signed, sealed, delivered, I'm yours."

The song was a series of firsts for the 20-year-old Wonder: "Signed, Sealed, Delivered (I'm Yours)" was the first single Wonder produced on his own, and was also the first to feature his female backup singing group composed of Lynda Tucker Laurence (who went on to become a member of The Supremes), Syreeta Wright (who also co-wrote the song and later married Wonder), and Venetta Fields.  The song gave Wonder his sixth Grammy nomination, with the award that year going to the Clarence Carter song "Patches".

Cash Box stated that the song is "polished and powerful enough to maintain an adult market power as well pointing toward giant sales." It is ranked number 203 on Rolling Stones list of The 500 Greatest Songs of All Time.

Charts

Weekly charts

Year-end charts

Certifications

Political significance 

During the 2008 presidential election, Barack Obama's presidential campaign frequently played the song immediately after Obama's speeches at campaign events. Wonder performed the song live on the final night of the 2008 Democratic National Convention at Invesco Field in Denver, Colorado.  During the campaign, Obama's chief campaign strategist, David Axelrod, used the song as the special ring tone on his cellular phone whenever he received a call from Obama.

At Obama's election night rally at Grant Park in Chicago, the song was one of the first of three songs played to warm up the audience for Obama's victory speech upon winning the election. The song was used in the same fashion the Clinton-Gore campaign used Fleetwood Mac's hit "Don't Stop." The Obama family came out to the song again on Election Night in 2012 for Obama's victory speech.

At the 2016 Democratic National Convention, the song played after Barack Obama's speech, at which point Democratic nominee Hillary Clinton came out on stage.

Peter Frampton cover

In 1977, Peter Frampton recorded the song on his album I'm in You. His version also contains instrumental elements from Wonder's hit "For Once in My Life". Mick Jagger is featured on backing vocals.  Frampton's version was released as a single, reaching number 18 on the Billboard Hot 100 and number 13 on the Cashbox Top 100. His cover also reached number 13 in Canada.  In Chicago, the song reached number nine on superstation WLS-AM, and in Toronto it reached number one on CHUM.

Charts

Weekly charts

Year-end charts

Blue version

"Signed, Sealed, Delivered I'm Yours" was covered in 2003 by English boy band Blue. Their version includes vocals from Angie Stone and Wonder. This was the second single from Blue's third album, Guilty (2003), and was released in Australia two weeks before it was issued in the UK. The cover peaked at number 11 on the UK Singles Chart and reached the top 20 on the charts of six other countries. Janet Jackson was originally approached to cover the song with the group but could not proceed due to scheduling conflicts.

Track listings
UK CD1
 "Signed, Sealed, Delivered I'm Yours" – 3:39
 "One Love" – 3:25

UK CD2
 "Signed, Sealed, Delivered I'm Yours" (radio edit) – 3:33
 "4 Play" – 3:22
 "Guilty" (original demo) – 3:25
 "Signed, Sealed, Delivered I'm Yours" (video and photo gallery enhanced) – 3:33

Charts

Weekly charts

Year-end charts

Release history

Other covers

 Shortly before being signed by Uni Records, Elton John (then performing under his birth name, Reg Dwight) recorded a cover of it for a collection of top hits of the day that were released as discount LP "sound-alike" versions. It was later released on several CD compilations, perhaps the most notable of which was Reg Dwight's Piano Goes Pop! Elton's (or rather Reg's) version was later included under the end titles of the 2004 romantic comedy film Laws of Attraction starring Pierce Brosnan and Julianne Moore.
 In the early 1970s, Bobby Byrd performed an up-tempo cover of this song on a single with other songs performed by James Brown and Lyn Collins.

 In 1975, The Osmonds covered the song, and it appears on their album Around the World, Live in Concert.
 In 1976, Marcia Hines covered the song on her album, Shining.
 In 1976, Stuff (band) released a live album from their set at the Montreux Jazz Festival which included an instrumental cover of this track.
 In 1978, Gwen McCrae released a cover on album Let's Straighten It Out.
 In 1980, co-writer Syreeta Wright released her own version of the song on her second self-titled album.
 In 1981, Jermaine Jackson covered the song on his album, I Like Your Style.
 In 1982, the Boys Town Gang covered "Signed, Sealed, Delivered".  It became a Top 10 hit in the Netherlands.
 In 1988, Chaka Khan released her album CK of which the song was the first track. Wonder played harmonica on Khan's version.
 In 1995, Kim Wilde performed the track during the last episode of Don't Forget Your Toothbrush on UK television.
 Jazz fusion and contemporary jazz group Pieces of a Dream presented their version from the band's 1998 album Pieces.
 Former adult film star Colton Ford and dance diva Pepper Mashay recorded a club version of this song in 2004. This version went to number 9 on the Hot Dance Club Play and number 25 on the Hot Dance Singles Sales charts.

 In 2004, Arkells released a version of the song as the A-side to their Record Store Day release entitled Arkells Sing Motown.
 Human Nature successfully remade the song to feature in their Motown album Dancing in the Street: the Songs of Motown II released in 2006.
 Charlie Daniels covered the song with Bonnie Bramlett on his 2007 duet album, Deuces
 English singer Craig David has covered the song on his fifth studio album, inspired by the same name Signed Sealed Delivered (2010).
 Michael Bolton released a cover of the song in early 2013 on his album Ain't No Mountain High Enough: A Tribute to Hitsville.
 In 2013, Straight No Chaser covered the song with Wonder on their Under the Influence album.
 In 2014, Irish singer Ronan Keating covered the song for the film Postman Pat: The Movie.
 Becca Tobin as her character Kitty Wilde covered this song on the fourth season of the musical comedy Glee as part of a tribute episode to Stevie Wonders titled "Wonder-ful".
 Rufus Wainwright released a version in 2017 that was part of a tribute for a fundraising gala that honored Wonder.
 In 2018, The Fearless Flyers covered the song (as ″Signed Sealed Delivered") as part of their eponymous debut EP. The track features Sandra Crouch on tambourine and Blake Mills on guitar.
 For the 2021 Christmas special of the DreamWorks Animation franchise Trolls, titled Trolls: Holiday in Harmony this song is covered by Anderson .Paak, Anna Kendrick, Anthony Ramos, Ester Dean, and Justin Timberlake.

References

External links
 List of cover versions of "Signed, Sealed, Delivered I'm Yours" at SecondHandSongs.com
 
 

1970 songs
1970 singles
1977 singles
2003 singles
Stevie Wonder songs
Cashbox number-one singles
Peter Frampton songs
Blue (English band) songs
Boys Town Gang songs
Songs written by Stevie Wonder
Songs written by Syreeta Wright
Songs written by Lula Mae Hardaway
Songs written by Lee Garrett
Tamla Records singles
A&M Records singles
Polydor Records singles
Innocent Records singles
Virgin Records singles
Song recordings produced by Stevie Wonder
Barack Obama 2008 presidential campaign
Barack Obama 2012 presidential campaign